Nicholas Crispo, Patrizio Veneto (or Niccolò; 1392–1450), became Lord of Syros in 1420 and Regent of the Duchy of the Archipelago between 1447 and 1450. He was a son of Francesco I Crispo, tenth Duke of the Archipelago, and wife Fiorenza I Sanudo, Lady of Milos, and brother of Dukes Giacomo I, John II and William II.

Marriage and issue
It is not known for certain how many wives he had. In a letter dated 1426 Crispo says he was married to the daughter of Jacopo Gattilusio, lord of Lesbos. In a 1474 chronicle by the Venetian traveller Caterino Zeno it is said that he was married to an Eudoksia Valenza, of whom there is no other mention in any source. Although Zeno claims that she was a daughter of John IV of Trebizond, this has been disproved by historiographical research, which has shown that John had an only daughter, Theodora Despina (married to Uzun Hassan of Ak Koyunlu). Alternative identities have been proposed for Valenza: whether it was the name of Gattilusio's daughter, whether she was a daughter of Alexios IV of Trebizond or whether she was a Genoese woman.
 Caterina Crispo, married in 1429 Angelo I Gozzadini, Lord of Kythnos (- 1468/76)
 Lucrezia Crispo, married Nobil Huomo Leone Malipiero, Patrizio Veneto
 Francesco II Crispo
 Petronilla Crispo, married in 1437 Nobil Huomo Jacopo Priuli, Patrizio Veneto
 Maria Crispo, married Nobil Huomo Nicolo Balbi, Patrizio Veneto
 Fiorenza Crispo (–1501), married in 1444 Nobil Huomo Marco Cornaro, Cavaliere del Sacro Romano Impero, Patrizio Veneto (Venice, December 1406 – Venice, 1 August 1479), and had:
 Giorgio Cornaro
 Catherine Cornaro
 Valenza Crispo, married Nobil Huomo Giovanni Loredan, Patrizio Veneto
 Marco Crispo, Knight of the Knights Hospitaller, who had illegitimate issue
 Violante Crispo, married Nobil Huomo Caterino Zeno, Patrizio Veneto, Diplomat of the Venetian Republic
 Anthony Crispo, Lord of Syros

References
 

An account by Caterino Zeno dated to 1474 names Niccolò as married to an otherwise unknown Valenza, sister of Theodora Megali Komnene, daughter of John IV of Trebizond. Whether this means Niccolò took a second wife or whether Zeno was in error has been debated by genealogists

1392 births
1450 deaths
Duchy of the Archipelago
Nicholas
Lords of Syros
People from the Cyclades
Regents